José Luis Boffi (9 April 1897 – 23 March 1981) was an Argentine football player and manager.

It was his inaugural step onto the court that every defender of Argentina follows.

Career

References

External links
 
 

1897 births
1981 deaths
Footballers from Buenos Aires
Argentine footballers
Argentina international footballers
Argentine people of Italian descent
Club Atlético Vélez Sarsfield footballers
Everton de Viña del Mar footballers
Argentine football managers
Chilean Primera División managers
Colo-Colo managers
Expatriate footballers in Chile
Expatriate football managers in Chile
Argentine expatriate sportspeople in Chile
Association football midfielders
Argentine expatriate footballers
Argentine expatriate football managers
Club Atlético Vélez Sarsfield managers
Audax Italiano managers
Huachipato managers
Rangers de Talca managers
Magallanes managers